The answer-seizure ratio (ASR) is  the percentage of telephone calls which are answered, a measure of network quality and call success rates in telecommunications.

Definition
In telecommunication an attempted call is termed a seizure; the answer-seizure ratio is defined as 100 times the ratio of answered calls, i.e. the number of seizures resulting in an answer signal, to the total number of seizures:

Busy signals and other call rejections by the telephone network count as call failures. However, the inclusion in the ASR accounting of some failed calls varies in practical applications. This makes the ASR highly dependent on end-user action. Low answer-seizure ratios may be caused by far-end switch congestion, not answering by called parties and busy destination circuits.

See also
 Network Effectiveness Ratio
 Call detail record
 Average call duration

References

Telephony